The men's 100 metre breaststroke event at the 1988 Summer Olympics took place between 18–19 September at the Jamsil Indoor Swimming Pool in Seoul, South Korea.

Records
Prior to this competition, the existing world and Olympic records were as follows.

Results

Heats
Rule: The eight fastest swimmers advance to final A (Q), while the next eight to final B (q).

Swimoff

* Opted to swim for the consolation final instead.

Finals

Final B

Final A

References

External links
 Official Report
 USA Swimming

Swimming at the 1988 Summer Olympics
Men's events at the 1988 Summer Olympics